Birds Are Singing in Kigali is a 2017 Polish drama film directed by Joanna Kos-Krauze and Krzysztof Krauze. The film tells the story of a Polish ornithologist who saves a Tutsi girl from certain death. Kos-Krauze completed the film after her husband died mid-production in 2014.

Plot 
The Polish ornithologist Anna Keller (Jowita Budnik) conducts research on vultures in Rwanda. Meanwhile, the conflict between the two population groups living in this country - Tutsi and Hutu, turns into the Tutsi genocide. Keller saves a young Rwandan (Eliane Umuhire) and takes her with him to Poland. It is a film about the power of nature, friendship and forgiveness.

Cast
 Jowita Budnik as Anna Keller
 Eliane Umuhire as Claudine Mugambira
 Witold Wieliński as Witek

Awards 
Budnik and Umuhire received joint awards for the best actress at the 42nd Gdynia Film Festival and at the Festival in Karlovy Vary. At the Festival in Gdynia, the Krauze couple received the Silver Lions for the film, and Katarzyna Leśniak received the award for the best editing.

References

External links 

2017 films
2017 drama films
Polish drama films
Rwandan genocide films
English-language Polish films
English-language Rwandan films